This is a partial chronological list of cases decided by the United States Supreme Court during the Burger Court, the tenure of Chief Justice Warren Earl Burger from June 23, 1969 through September 26, 1986.

References 

Burger
List